Klickmann is a surname. Notable people with the surname include:

F. Henri Klickmann (1885–1966), American composer, songwriter, musician, and arranger of music
Flora Klickmann (1867–1958), English journalist, author, and editor